Jitia is a commune located in Vrancea County, Romania. It is composed of five villages: Cerbu, Dealu Sării, Jitia, Jitia de Jos and Măgura.

References

Communes in Vrancea County
Localities in Muntenia